"Runaway" is a song by Sahlene, the Eurovision 2002 entrant for that year's host nation, .

Music, lyrics and production 
The song is an upbeat number with English lyrics which advise the narrator's "babe" to be more open minded in his life's vision: "just runaway to the stars / I'll be waiting above". The resemblance of the melody of "Runaway" to that of "I Believe I Can Fly" was much noted: Alar Kotkas, co-writer of "Runaway", recognized the songs were similar but denied any plagiarism.

The studio recording of "Runaway" was produced by : the background vocals were performed by Sahlene with one of her Eurovision backing vocalists Lena Olsson-Björkén. "Runaway" was Sahlene's only release on Virgin Records: the track made its album debut on her 2003 album release It's Been a While (M&L Records).

Placing the song with a performer 
However, Ines withdrew shortly before Eurolaul 2002 – the Estonian preselection Eurovision round – and the song's composers, after unsuccessfully shopping their song to a number of Estonian singers including Koit Toome – contacted the Swedish division of Virgin Records who suggested Sahlene who was on the Virgin roster: on the evening of the same day Sahlene received a telephone call from Virgin Records and resultantly flew out to the Estonian capital of Tallinn at 6 a.m. the following morning. Sahlene had two weeks to work with the song's composers prior to performing "Runaway" in Eurolaul.

Performance at Eurolaul 2002 
Eurolaul 2002 was held at the Linnahall on the evening of January 26, 2002 and broadcast live on ETV.

Performed ninth in a field of ten Eurolaul entrants, "Runaway" was not the top vote getter from the television viewers who were invited to vote for their favorite number and who favored "Another Country Song" by Nightlight Duo & Cowboys which entrant received 40% of the popular vote. However the official decision as to the winner of Eurolaul was made by an international panel of eight judges whose votes decided that "Runaway" by Sahlene would be the Estonian entrant at Eurovision 2002, the judges' vote awarding "Runaway" eighty-five points, twenty more than the Eurolaul runner-up which was "Another Country Song".

Performance at the Eurovision Song Contest 2002 
On the night of May 25, 2002 at the Eurovision Song Contest mounted at Saku Suurhall Arena in Tallinn, "Runaway" was the eighth entrant performed, following 's Prime Minister with "Northern Girl" and preceding 's Karolina with "Od nas zavisi". Sahlene performed in a white leather outfit she'd designed with lyricist Jana Hallas: she wore a midriff baring sleeveless shirt with a plunging v-neck and a fringe over one arm, a slotted skirt and high boots. Although Sahlene's performance at Eurolaul two months previous had featured a chorale of Estonian vocalists: specifically Kaire Vilgats, Dagmar Oja, Pearu Paulus and Johannes Lõhmus, her backing ensemble for Eurovision featured only two vocalists, one Estonian, Jelena Juzvik, and one Swedish, Lena Olsson-Björkén. At the close of voting, the tally for "Runaway" was 111 points, which result tied "Runaway" with the  entrant "Come Back" by Jessica Garlick for third place in a field of twenty-four.

"Runaway" was succeeded as Estonian representative at the 2003 contest by Ruffus with "Eighties Coming Back".

The composers of "Runaway" would again have a song they had written be the Estonian Eurovision entrant: the Eurovision 2006 entrant "Through My Window" which, like "Runaway", was performed by a Swedish vocalist, in this case Sandra Oxenryd.

Chart performance 
On the June 6, 2006 chart of the Top 60 singles in Sweden, "Runaway" by Sahlene debuted at #20: this proved to be the track's peak although it remained on the chart for a total of seventeen weeks, thirteen of them in the Top 40 with seven of those weeks spent in the Top 25.

References

Eurovision songs of Estonia
Eurovision songs of 2002
2002 songs